Sueli Pereira dos Santos (born January 8, 1965 in Cascavel, Paraná) is a retired female javelin thrower from Brazil. At the age of 35, she set her personal best (61.98 metres) on May 6, 2000 in Bogotá.  That mark was a Masters W35 World Record that lasted about a month until it was surpassed by Russian Olympian Yekaterina Ivakina, who would improve the record four more times in the next two months.

International competitions

References

sports-reference

1965 births
Living people
People from Cascavel
Brazilian female javelin throwers
Olympic athletes of Brazil
Athletes (track and field) at the 2000 Summer Olympics
Pan American Games athletes for Brazil
Athletes (track and field) at the 1991 Pan American Games
Athletes (track and field) at the 1999 Pan American Games
World Athletics Championships athletes for Brazil
Sportspeople from Paraná (state)
20th-century Brazilian women